Michel Alvès (14 September 1940, Nice) is a French writer.

He is the author of four novels:
1962: Le Pêcheur, Éditions Grasset
1962: Entre les barricades, Grasset
1972: Le Territoire, Jean-Jacques Pauvert, Prix Contrepoint in 1975
1994: Le Livre d'heures, Éditions Phébus, 
as well as a collection of poems, Des lois naturelles.

External links 
 Michel Alvès on the site of the Éditions Phebus
 Le Livre d’heures de Michel Alvès on Le Matricule des Anges

20th-century French novelists
20th-century French male writers
French erotica writers
People from Nice
1941 births
Living people